Owieczki may refer to the following places:
Owieczki, Gniezno County in Greater Poland Voivodeship (west-central Poland)
Owieczki, Łódź Voivodeship (central Poland)
Owieczki, Podlaskie Voivodeship (north-east Poland)
Owieczki, Oborniki County in Greater Poland Voivodeship (west-central Poland)